Church of Sts. Peter and Paul—Catholic is a historic church building on State Street in Gilman, Minnesota, United States.  It was built in 1930 to serve a Polish-American congregation and designed in the Beaux Arts style by the Minneapolis architectural firm of Cordell & Olson. The first church was a log structure in 1872.  It was known as the church of St. Wenceslas.  Then a new church was built in the 1880s and was a frame structure known as St. Casimir's Church.  The old log church was converted into classrooms.  A new school building was built in 1909 and is present today. St. Casimir's church was destroyed by fire in 1891. A new and larger frame building was constructed for the new church. This church building stood north of the present brick building. The school building was completed in 1909. Fr. Vincent Wotzka as pastor had a brick rectory built in 1924. It was also designed by Cordelia and Olson. Sometime during these early years, the name of the parish was changed to Saints Peter and Paul. No reason has been found for the change. The church complex was added to the National Register of Historic Places in 1982.

References

External links

Parish website

Religious organizations established in 1872
Roman Catholic churches completed in 1909
Churches in the Roman Catholic Diocese of Saint Cloud
Polish-American culture in Minnesota
Beaux-Arts architecture in Minnesota
Buildings and structures in Benton County, Minnesota
National Register of Historic Places in Benton County, Minnesota
Churches on the National Register of Historic Places in Minnesota
20th-century Roman Catholic church buildings in the United States
1872 establishments in Minnesota